Moulton's handfish (Sympterichthys moultoni) is an endangered species of handfish in the genus Sympterichthys. It is endemic to a few locations off the southeastern coast of Australia. It was first described as a distinct species in 2009 by Peter Last and Daniel Gledhill. It lives at a depth of around  - .

References 

Brachionichthyidae
Endangered fish
Moulton's handfish